Roussin's black salt is a chemical compound with the formula KFe4S3(NO)7.  It consists of the potassium salt of the  [Fe4S3(NO)7]− anion, metal nitrosyl compound. First described by Zacharie Roussin in 1858, it is one of the first synthetic iron-sulfur clusters along with the red salt also bearing his name.

Structure
The cluster anion has the geometry of an incomplete cubane-type cluster with C3v symmetry. The dark colour of the complex is attributed to a number of charge-transfer interactions.

Synthesis
Roussin’s black salt is produced by the reaction of nitrous acid, potassium hydroxide, potassium sulfide, and iron(II) sulfate in aqueous solution. It can also be formed by the conversion of Roussin's red salt in mildly acidic conditions. This reaction is reversible and Roussin’s red salt is reformed upon alkalization of the reaction solution.

Uses
Roussin’s black salt is a nitric oxide donor. Also, Roussin’s Black Salt exhibits antibacterial activity in some food processing applications.

See also
 Roussin's red salt

References

Iron complexes
Sulfur compounds
Nitrosyl complexes